Eintracht Frankfurt started the 2008–09 season competing in the Bundesliga and the DFB-Pokal.

Players

First-team squad
Squad at end of season

Left club during season

Eintracht Frankfurt II

Transfers

In:

Out:

Results
Results for Eintracht Frankfurt for season 2008–09.

NOTE: scores are written Eintracht first
NOTE: fixtures marked with a * are not scheduled yet definitely

Key:
BL = Bundesliga
GC = German Cup (DFB-Pokal)
F = Friendly match
IT = Indoor tournament

Notes

Sources

 Official English Eintracht website 
 Eintracht-Archiv.de
 2008–09 Eintracht Frankfurt season at Fussballdaten.de 

2008–09
German football clubs 2008–09 season